Mogilno is a town in central Poland, situated in the Kuyavian-Pomeranian Voivodeship (since 1999), previously in Bydgoszcz Voivodeship (1975–1998).

History
Mogilno is one of the oldest settlements along the border of the Greater Poland and Kuyavia historical regions. Since the turn of the 8th and 9th century until the 10th century an early-medieval settlement existed there, at the long narrow headland surrounded by waters of Mogilno Lake from the west and south and marshes from the east.

In 1065, a Benedictine abbey was founded there by Bolesław the Generous. North of the abbey a town later developed, which in 1398 was granted a city charter, and which was the abbey's property until 1773.

After the first Partition of Poland in 1772 the city became a part of the Kingdom of Prussia, and in 1920 it returned to Poland.

Since 1898 until his death in 1910 a parish priest in Mogilno's other church St. Jacob (Św. Jakuba) was Piotr Wawrzyniak.

Massacre during Second World War
On 18 September 1939, during the Invasion of Poland, German forces incited by members of Mogilno German minority killed 40 Poles, one of whom was of Jewish descent. The victims were picked out by local Volksdeutsche with Polish citizenship for execution. The oldest victim was 75, the youngest 17.

Sights

The former Benedictine abbey; church dates back to 11th century, rebuilt in 13th and 1st half of 16th centuries in late-Gothic style, and also later in 2nd half of 18th century in late-Baroque. Facade is from end of 18th century. The church still retained many Romanesque parts, as pillars, parts of walls in the nave, and particularly well preserved are apse and two crypts. The three-winged abbey with garth dates from the 14th century, and was rebuilt in the 18th.
Late-Gothic church of St. James dating back to ca. 1511
Centre of the city with houses from 19th century
Cemetery with a monument to Piotr Wawrzyniak (and a second monument to him at park)

Culture, sport and tourism
The town is home to the Mogilno Film Academy as well as a cinema. The film Voodoo Dad was set and shot entirely in the town.

There is a local museum dedicated to the local area, a local cultural institute, and several organisations dedicated to cultural activities and local venues.

It is also a focal point of many tourist trails and nature walks, most notably the Piast Trail. The scenic location also attracts a number of tourists looking to relax in the nearby forests and lakes.

The local football team is Pogoń Mogilno.

Twin Towns
 Engelskirchen, Germany, since 2012

References

External links
.
Visit Mogilno, in visittorun.pl.
Official town web page (in Polish).
Portal CMG24.pl - Mogilno, Dąbrowa, Strzelno i Jeziora Wielkie, (in Polish).
Cloister Mogilno, (in Polish).
Chemirol Company Ltd., Mogilno (in Polish).

 
Mogilno County
Cities and towns in Kuyavian-Pomeranian Voivodeship
Poznań Voivodeship (1921–1939)
Massacres in Poland
Nazi war crimes in Poland
Mass murder in 1939